Bradyrhizobium denitrificans is a bacterium from the genus Bradyrhizobium which was isolated from surface lake water in Germany.

References

Further reading

External links
Type strain of Bradyrhizobium denitrificans at BacDive -  the Bacterial Diversity Metadatabase

Nitrobacteraceae
Bacteria described in 2011